The Ahmadu Bello Stadium, simply referred to as ABS is a multipurpose stadium in Kaduna city, Kaduna State, Nigeria. It was designed in 1965 by the English architects Jane Drew and Maxwell Fry.  As of 2016, it is  used mostly for football matches. The stadium has a capacity of 16,000 people.

The stadium consists of a main section for track and field events as well as football and two indoor sports centers.

Mr Dare Sunday - the Sports Minister, during his visit to Ahmadu Bello Stadium (ABS) in Kaduna applauded the maintenance culture of the facilities and the state of the stadium. He was pleased that even though Ahmadu Bello Stadium has been existing for more than 50 years ago, it is still in good condition. He further said "what I have seen today is not disappointing but, there is room for improvement on the facility.” The facilities inspected by the minister at the Ahmadu Bello Stadium included the football playing pitch, swimming pool, indoor games hall and hostels, among others.

Notable football events

1998 African Women's Championship

1999 FIFA World Youth Championship

2009 FIFA U-17 World Cup

References

Kaduna
Football venues in Nigeria
Kaduna